Curlew is an unincorporated community and census-designated place (CDP) located in northwestern Ferry County, Washington, United States, between Malo and Danville on State Route 21. The BNSF Railway ran through the town. The historic Ansorge Hotel is located in Curlew. As of the 2010 census, the population of the community was 118. The settlement is named for the curlew birds once prevalent in the area.

Geography
Curlew is located at the confluence of Long Alec Creek and the Kettle River.

One of the most popular sites on the Kettle River in summer is "the Old Swimming Hole" near the center of town. Curlew was a pick-up point for moonshine that was dropped in the Kettle River. The tradition is still celebrated on the first Sunday in June each year during the Curlew Barrel Derby Days. A barrel is set adrift in the Kettle River at the Job Corps Bridge, and local citizens bet on when it will reach town.

Early community
In 1896 two traders, Guy S. Helphry and J. Walters, set up a general store at an old ferry crossing near the junction of Curlew Creek and the Kettle River. The site around the store grew into a collection of log buildings and other stores. By 1901, a bridge was built across the Kettle River and the community had grown to a population of 200. The community contained two general stores, two saloons, a hotel, two livery stables, a dry goods store and several other businesses. In 1898, a post office was established and the town was named "Curlew". Miners, railroad workers, natives, and others passed through the region. Nearby mines such as Drummer, Lancaster and Panama grew. Curlew never really expanded beyond those early boom years. In the 1950s, there was nearby Curlew Air Force Station, part of the network of Air Defense Command radar stations.

Railroad expansion
In fall 1901, the Republic and Kettle Valley Railway (operating as the Kettle Valley Lines) (KVL), and Washington and Great Northern Railway (W&GN) (operating as the
Spokane Falls and Northern Railway subsidiary of the Great Northern Railway) (GN) were building competing Grand Forks (BC)–Curlew–Republic (WA) lines. About a mile north of Curlew, the KVL grade passed over the GN one. In January 1902, GN construction crews were unsuccessful in pulling down the KVL trestlework that crossed the GN track. Law enforcement officers diffused a series of subsequent confrontations.

KVL, which began the Grand Forks–Curlew–St. Peter's Creek passenger service in March 1902, extended the line to five or six miles north of Republic in April, and held a symbolic last spike ceremony. That July, the GN Marcus (WA)–Grand Forks–Curlew–Republic passenger service began. GN began Curlew–Midway (BC) passenger service in December 1905.

Railroad demise
In 1919, the KVL became insolvent, and all services are believed to have ceased that year, and the track was subsequently abandoned. In 1935, GN abandoned Curlew–Molson. In 2006, the Kettle Falls International Railway, the GN successor, abandoned the 28.5-mile San Poil–Danville section, ending all railroad service to Curlew.

Notable person
Bud Podbielan, professional baseball player

See also
 Ferry-Midway Border Crossing

Footnotes

References

Census-designated places in Washington (state)
Census-designated places in Ferry County, Washington
Populated places in the Okanagan Country